Daegu Technical University is a private technical university located in the Dalseo-gu district of Daegu, the third-largest city in South Korea.  It provides training in primarily industrial fields.  About 60 instructors are employed.

Academics

Academic offerings are provided through the four academic divisions of the college:  Engineering, Humanities and Society, Natural Science, and Arts.  The majority of offerings, in fields such as automotive science and computer information, are under the Division of Engineering.

History

The college was founded in 1976 by the Daegu Educational Foundation, as Daegu Industrial Technical School (대구실업전문학교).  It became a technical college in 1979, and took on its present name in 1998.

See also
Education in South Korea
List of colleges and universities in South Korea

External links

Vocational education in South Korea
Universities and colleges in Daegu
1976 establishments in South Korea
Educational institutions established in 1976